The Gumberg Library houses the collections at Duquesne University in Pittsburgh, Pennsylvania, and comprises more than a half million print volumes.

History
The Duquesne University library system began in 1878, when what was then known as the "Pittsburgh Catholic College of the Holy Ghost" was founded. The collection moved along with the university to the Bluff, and was for a long time housed in the Old Main administration building.

In 1939, an anonymous contribution permitted work to begin on a new library building, in order to house the university's growing collection: that structure was given to the School of Law upon the completion of the current library. The Gumburg Library building was originally constructed as a printing plant, and saw use as a garage before it was redesigned for its new purpose and opened for service as the Duquesne University Library in 1978. On 3 February 1995, it was rededicated as the "Gumberg Library at Duquesne University," a tribute to the financial support of alumnus Stanley R. Gumberg (Class of 1950) and his wife, Marcia M. Gumberg.

Library resources
Today, the Gumberg Library is home to approximately 750,000 volumes, over 116,000 journal subscriptions (both print and electronic), over 200 research databases, and a variety of audiovisual materials.

Special collections
Duquesne University Archives - comprises the center for the documented history of Duquesne University
Cardinal Wright Collection - contains the prelate's personal library, with emphasis on deliberations from the Second Vatican Council and the Synods
Duquesne Authors Collection - encompasses bibliographic citations and links to publications written by the faculty and administrators of Duquesne University
Rabbi Herman Hailperin Collection - contains more than 2,600 volumes, and focuses on Judeo-Christian intellectual and theological relations during the Middle Ages
Simon Silverman Phenomenology Center - a collection of works related to phenomenological research and theory
Hon. Michael A. Musmanno Collection - contains the personal papers and library of the former State Supreme Court Justice and Congressman

References

External links
 The Duquesne University Gumberg Library website
 The Gumberg Library at The Library Index
 Gumberg Library Fast Facts

Duquesne University
Libraries in Pennsylvania
University and college academic libraries in the United States
1878 establishments in Pennsylvania
Libraries established in 1878